"Hicktown" is the debut single by American country music artist Jason Aldean, released on March 28, 2005 from his self-titled debut album. The song was written by Big & Rich's Big Kenny and John Rich along with Vicky McGehee. It was Aldean's first top 10 hit on the U.S. Billboard Hot Country Songs chart after reaching number 10 in late 2005.

Content
Co-written by Big & Rich along with Vicky McGehee, "Hicktown" is an up-tempo song, and one of many country songs that boast of Southern culture.

"Hicktown" has become Aldean's signature song, with souvenir vanity plates naming it sold at appearances.  The song typically closes out Aldean's concert set, with elongated instrumental parts, Aldean banging on cymbals, and several false endings.

Music video
A music video was released for the song, directed by Wes Edwards. The video takes place in a field with people partying and driving on mud, while Jason Aldean and his band are performing. It premiered in April 28, 2005. Most of the music video was filmed in Palmdale, Florida at the C&R Mudhole, that is now closed down. Aldean's sister Kasi (wearing a green tank top) makes a cameo in the video.

Chart performance
The song debuted on the Billboard Hot Country Songs chart at number 55 for the week ending April 23, 2005.

Year-end charts

Certifications

References

2005 songs
2005 debut singles
Jason Aldean songs
Song recordings produced by Michael Knox (record producer)
Songs written by Vicky McGehee
Songs written by Big Kenny
Songs written by John Rich
Music videos directed by Wes Edwards
BBR Music Group singles